Mills Township is the name of some places in the U.S. state of Michigan:

 Mills Township, Midland County, Michigan
 Mills Township, Ogemaw County, Michigan

See also:
 Bay Mills Township, Michigan
 Mills Township (disambiguation)

Michigan township disambiguation pages